Elis Isufi (born 21 May 2000) is a Swiss footballer who plays as a defender for Kriens.

Club career
Born in Liestal, Vishi played his early football by local club FC Pratteln and moved to the youth section of FC Basel in 2012. Since then he has passed through all of the club's the junior levels. In the 2018/2019 season he made a total of 19 appearances, scoring one goal and in the 2019/2020 season he made a total of 15 appearances, also scoring one goal, with the U21 team in the Swiss Promotion League, the third tier of the Swiss football league system.

In Basel's 2019–20 season Isufi made his professional debut with his club in the Swiss Cup on 14 September 2019. Head coach Marcel Koller let Isufi play next to Emil Bergström as centre backs and they helped keep a clean sheet as Basel won 3–0 against FC Meyrin. Isufi's following appearance was in a 1-0 UEFA Europa League win over APOEL FC on 27 February 2020.

After these two games and three further test matches, Isufi Aplayed his domestic league debut for the club in the home game in the St. Jakob-Park on 4 July 2020 as Basel won 2–0 against Xamax.

On 15 June 2021, he joined Kriens.

International career
Born in Switzerland, Isufi is of Kosovo-Albanian descent. He is a youth international for Switzerland.

References

External links
 Elis Isufi at Verein "Basler Fussballarchiv" homepage
 
 SFL Profile
 SFV U16 Profile
 SFV U17 Profile
 SFV U18 Profile
 SFV U19 Profile
 SFV U20 Profile

2000 births
Living people
People from Liestal
Swiss men's footballers
Switzerland youth international footballers
Swiss people of Kosovan descent
Swiss people of Albanian descent
Association football defenders
FC Basel players
SC Kriens players
Swiss Super League players
Swiss Challenge League players
Sportspeople from Basel-Landschaft